The Chi Psi Fraternity House is a 1935 Tudor style, stucco over wood-frame structure near the University of Oregon in Eugene, Oregon. Some describe the style as Arts and Crafts.

The house was designed by Richard Sundeleaf as a residence for Chi Psi club members. It was listed on the National Register of Historic Places in 1993.

See also
 National Register of Historic Places listings in Lane County, Oregon

References

External links
 Chi Psi official site

National Register of Historic Places in Eugene, Oregon
Buildings and structures in Eugene, Oregon
1935 establishments in Oregon
Houses completed in 1935
Fraternity and sorority houses